Daniel Dardha (born 1 October 2005) is a Belgian chess grandmaster. He won the Belgian Chess Championship in 2019 at age 13, becoming the youngest player to do so.

Chess career
In 2017, aged 12, he won the U-14 Blitz Chess Championship. He earned his International Master title in 2019, shortly after winning the Belgian Chess Championship. He earned his Grandmaster title in 2021 after winning the Belgian Chess Championship for the second time, becoming Belgium's youngest ever Grandmaster at age 15.

He won the Belgian Chess Championship for the third time in 2022.

Personal life
Dardha's father, Arben Dardha, who became U-20 Albanian Champion at age 16, is a FIDE Master and, as of 2019, Daniel's coach (Daniel is also intermittently coached by Ivan Sokolov). Dardha's grandfather, Bardhyl Dardha, coached the Tomori chess club in Berat, Albania as well as his son. At age 82, he was still active in online chess.

References

External links

2005 births
Living people
Chess grandmasters
people from Mortsel
Belgian chess players
Belgian people of Albanian descent